The 36th Separate Marine Brigade named after Rear Admiral Mykhailo Bilynsky The Brigade was formed in 2015 on the basis of units withdrawn from the occupied Crimea – 1st and 501st Marine Battalion, which were previously part of Ukrainian 36th Coast Guard Brigade. The brigade participated in the Donbas war since its formation, primarily in Mariupol direction. In February 2022, when Russia invaded Ukraine, the majority of the brigade was located in Mariupol.

Establishment 
On 20 July 2015, less than a year following the evacuation of Ukrainian forces from Crimea, the 36th Separate Marine Brigade was formed from military units which had remained loyal to Ukraine following the peninsula's annexation by Russia. The brigade's first commander was Dmytro Deliatytskyi, who had formerly commanded the 1st Separate Marine Battalion.

2022 Russian invasion of Ukraine 

During the 2022 Russian invasion of Ukraine the 501st battalion of the brigade was, along with the Azov Regiment, one of the three main Ukrainian units defending Mariupol during its siege by the Russian and DPR forces. The battalion was largely destroyed during the course of the siege.

On 18 March, two Russian Kalibr missiles, fired from nearby Kherson, struck a Ukrainian army barracks in Mykolaiv housing some 200 soldiers whom were asleep at the time of the attack. Reports from the city morgue and Ukrainian soldiers stated that at least 80 Ukrainian soldiers were killed. It is presumed nearly all 200 soldiers were killed, as only one survivor was pulled from the rubble the next day and temperatures reached below  during the night.

On 13 April, the Ukrainian government forces stated that, as a result of a special operation, units of the 36th Separate Marine Brigade managed to connect with the Azov Regiment in Mariupol. The same day, Russian sources claimed that over 1,000 men of the brigade had been captured, but this remains unconfirmed. The brigade commander, Colonel Volodymyr Baranyuk, and his chief of staff were among those captured, leaving Major Serhiy Volyna in command of the remnants of the battalion entrenched inside the Azovstal Iron and Steel Works. The remnants of the unit surrendered on 20 May 2022, along with the remaining defenders of the Azovstal plant.

The 36th defended Mykolaiv — its garrison — during the Battle of Mykolaiv. Later the Brigade fought over control of the Kherson Oblast during the 2022 Ukrainian southern counteroffensive.

Structure 
As of 2022 the brigade's structure is as follows:

 36th Separate Marine Brigade, N/A
 Headquarters & Headquarters Company
 1st Marine Battalion (In 2014 during the annexation of Crimea, only 137 soldiers decided to return to Ukraine. In 2022, a few soldiers of the battalion were able to sneak out of the besieged Mariupol).
 501st Marine Battalion (In 2014 during the annexation of Crimea, only 64 soldiers decided to return to Ukraine. During the Siege of Mariupol in 2022, the unit betrayed the rest of the brigade and volunteerly surrendered).
 Aristide Battalion (Linear marine battalion of the brigade. In 2022, a few soldiers of the battalion were able to sneak out of the besieged Mariupol).
 Marine Tank Battalion (Tank battalion equipped with T-80BVs. The unit was defeated during the Siege of Mariupol in 2022).
 Artillery Battalion (Equipped with 2S1 and 2S3 self-propelled artillery and BM-21 Grads).
 Anti-Aircraft Company (The company provides protection against danger from the air. It’s equipped with 2K22 Tunguska and 2K35 Strela-10 vehicles).
 Support units (This includes all rear elements such as engineers, communication, medics, and material support unit).

References 

2015 establishments in Ukraine
Military units and formations of the Russo-Ukrainian War
Military units and formations established in 2015
Ukrainian Navy
Military units and formations of Ukraine
Military units and formations of the 2022 Russian invasion of Ukraine